Ambroise Sarr (born 14 December 1950) is a Senegalese wrestler. He competed at the 1976, 1980, 1984 and the 1988 Summer Olympics.

References

External links
 

1950 births
Living people
Senegalese male sport wrestlers
Olympic wrestlers of Senegal
Wrestlers at the 1976 Summer Olympics
Wrestlers at the 1980 Summer Olympics
Wrestlers at the 1984 Summer Olympics
Wrestlers at the 1988 Summer Olympics
Place of birth missing (living people)
20th-century Senegalese people
21st-century Senegalese people